Leopold Nitsch (14 August 1897 – January 1977) was an Austrian footballer and coach.

References

External links
 Rapid Archiv

1897 births
1977 deaths
Austrian footballers
Austria international footballers
Association football forwards
SK Rapid Wien players
Bulgaria national football team managers
SK Rapid Wien managers
Austrian football managers